Tazzie Colomb (born August 20, 1966) is an American professional female bodybuilder and powerlifter. She is one of the longest-competing IFBB female professional body builders of all time. She is one of the strongest female powerlifters in the world: she can lift 75 kg in each arm, and on a TV show easily lifted four girls (weighing 42–43 kg each) at the same time. Her stats are as follows: 
Chest               128 cm;
Waist               89 cm;
Hips                107 cm;
Size feet           43 ;
Size T-shirt        XXXL;
Size clothing USA   50"  37"  43";
Size neck           44 cm;
Size bicep          47 cm;
Size forearm        38 cm;
Size wrist          24 cm;
Size dress USA      22;
Max overhead lift   90 kg;
Max dumbbell arm     75 kg.

Biography

Tazzie described herself as a Catholic girl and was a top athlete at St. Pius and Cabrini. She never attended college. Her father is deceased and she has two older sisters, both of whom she no longer speaks to.

Powerlifter career

Contest history
 1999 Women's Extravaganza Strength Show - 2nd
 2001 Women's Extravaganza Strength Show - 6th
 2002 Women Extravaganza Strength Show - 6th

Bodybuilding career

Amateur career
In 1988, Tazzie debuted nationally at the NPC Junior Nationals, placing 9th in the heavyweight women's division. In 1992, she won the women's overall at the NPC USA Championships and qualified as an IFBB professional.

Professional career
At the 2000 Ms. International, Tazzie and Iris Kyle were both disqualified for diuretic use. In 2007, she won the heavyweight class at the IFBB Europa Supershow. She has attended the Ms. Olympia four times during her career. She is one of longest competing IFBB professional bodybuilders of all time. She has placed in the top five 13 times in her professional bodybuilding career up to 2013.

Competition history
 1988 NPC Junior Nationals - 9th (Heavyweight category (HW))
 1990 NPC Eastern Seaboard - 2nd (HW)
 1990 NPC Junior Nationals - 4th (HW)
 1990 NPC USA Championships - 3rd (HW)
 1991 IFBB North American Championships - 2nd (HW)
 1992 NPC USA Championships - 1st (HW & Overall)
 1993 IFBB Jan Tana Pro Classic - 11th
 1994 IFBB Jan Tana Pro Classic - 3rd
 1996 IFBB Jan Tana Pro Classic - 3rd
 1997 IFBB Ms. International - 3rd
 1997 IFBB Ms. Olympia - 17th
 1999 IFBB Ms. International - 4th (Later disqualified)
 1999 IFBB Ms. Olympia - 6th
 2000 IFBB Ms. International - 5th
 2001 IFBB Ms. International - 7th
 2002 IFBB Jan Tana Pro Classic - 3rd (HW)
 2002 IFBB Show of Strength Pro Championship - 3rd (HW)
 2006 IFBB Atlantic City Pro - 3rd
 2006 IFBB Europa Supershow - 4th
 2006 IFBB Ms. Olympia - 11th
 2007 IFBB Europa Supershow - 1st (HW)
 2007 IFBB Ms. Olympia - 12th
 2008 IFBB Ms. International - 11th
 2009 IFBB New York Pro Championships - 6th
 2010 IFBB Battle of Champions - 8th
 2011 IFBB Battle of Champions - 4th
 2012 IFBB Battle of Champions - 4th
 2012 IFBB Chicago Pro Championships - 4th
 2012 IFBB Tampa Pro Championships - 7th
 2013 IFBB Ms. International - 9th
 2013 IFBB Tampa Pro Championships - 13th

Personal life
Tazzie currently lives in New Orleans, Louisiana.  She is single. She is the personal trainer of Aaron Neville.

References

External links
 Official website

1966 births
American female bodybuilders
American powerlifters
Female powerlifters
Living people
People from Jefferson Parish, Louisiana
People from New Orleans
Professional bodybuilders
Sportspeople from New Orleans
21st-century American women